Nils Gunnar Wiggo Lund (born 26 July 1947) is a Swedish diplomat and politician.

Gunnar Lund did his military service as an interpreter in Uppsala and was educated in Russian. He graduated from Stockholm University and Uppsala University with a bachelor's degree in political economics, political science and Russian in 1971. Lund received a master's degree in political economics and international law from Columbia University in 1972.

Lund has served as a diplomat in Copenhagen, at the OECD in Paris and as the Permanent Representation of Sweden to the European Union.

From 2002 until 2004 he served as minister for International Monetary Exchange in the Swedish cabinet. From 1 September 2005 until 2007 he was the Swedish Ambassador to the United States and from the fall of 2007 he served as the Swedish ambassador to France.

Personal life 
Lund is married to Kari Lotsberg. They have three children: Gustav (born 1984) Harald (1987) and Ingrid (1990).

References

External links
Washington Diplomat Bio

School of International and Public Affairs, Columbia University alumni
1947 births
Living people
Ambassadors of Sweden to the United States
Ambassadors of Sweden to France
Fulbright alumni